This is a list of Zambian provinces by Human Development Index as of 2021 without the 2011 created Muchinga Province.

References 

Provinces of Zambia
Zambia
Economy of Zambia